This is a list of events and openings related to amusement parks that occurred in 2009. These various lists are not exhaustive.

Amusement Parks

Opening 

 China Happy Valley Chengdu – January 17
 China Happy Valley Shanghai – August 16
 Indonesia Trans Studio Makassar – September 9

Birthday 
PowerPark – 10th Anniversary
Thorpe Park – 30th Anniversary
Busch Gardens Tampa – 50th Anniversary
Gulliver's Land – 10th Anniversary
Walibi Rhône-Alpes – 30th Anniversary
Legoland California – 10th Anniversary
Adventure City – 15th Anniversary
Universal's Islands of Adventure – 10th Anniversary

Closed 
 Cypress Gardens - September 23
 Freestyle Music Park
 Kiddieland Amusement Park - September 27
 Dreamland
 Tama Tech - September 30

Additions

Roller Coasters

New

Relocated

Refurbished

Other Attractions

New

Refurbished

Relocated

Closed attractions & roller coasters

References

Amusement parks by year
2009-related lists